State Route 170 (SR 170) is a  state highway that serves as an east-west connection between Wetumpka and Eclectic through Elmore County. SR 170 intersects US 231 at its western terminus and SR 63 at its eastern terminus.

Route description
SR 170 begins at its intersection with US 231 in Wetumpka. SR 170 then generally travels in a northeasterly course in intersecting SR 14 prior to leaving Wetumpka en route to its eastern terminus at SR 63 in Eclectic.

Major intersections

References

170
Transportation in Elmore County, Alabama